The "trap" event, officially the ISSF Olympic trap, is an event held at the Summer Olympic Games. The men's event was introduced in 1900, and held at most editions of the Games (except 1904 and 1928, when no shooting events were held, and 1932 to 1948) and every edition since 1952. As with most shooting events, it was nominally open to women from 1968 to 1980; the trap remained open to women through 1992. Very few women participated these years. The event returned to being men-only for 1996, though the new double trap had separate events for men and women that year. In 2000, a separate women's event was added and it has been contested at every Games since. There was also a men's team trap event held four times from 1908 to 1924.

Medals

Men's trap medals

Men's trap multiple medalists

Men's trap medalists by nation

Women's trap medals

Women's trap multiple medalists

Women's trap medalists by nation

Men's double trap medals

Men's double trap multiple medalists

Men's double trap medalists by nation

Women's double trap medals

Women's double trap multiple medalists

Women's double trap medalists by nation

Men's team trap medals

Men's team trap multiple medalists

Men's team trap medalists by nation

References

Trap
Trap at the Olympics